Panamarathupatti block  is a revenue block of Salem district of the Indian state of Tamil Nadu. This revenue block consist of 20 panchayat villages.  They are:
 Amani Kondalampatti
 Ammapalayam
 Dasanaickenpatti
 Ervadivaniyampadi
 Gajjalnaickenpatti
 Kammalapatti
 Kuralnatham
 Mookkuthipalayam
 Nazhikkalpatti
 Neikkarapatty
 Nilavarapatti
 Pallitherupatti
 Parapatti
 Peramanur
 Santhiyur
 Santhiyur Attayampatty
 Thammanaickenpatty
 Thippampatty
 Thumbalpatti
 Vazhakkuttapatti

References 

Revenue blocks of Salem district